The Ambassador of the United Kingdom to the Czech Republic is the United Kingdom's foremost diplomatic representative in the Czech Republic, and head of the UK's diplomatic mission there. The official title is His Britannic Majesty's Ambassador to the Czech Republic.

This list includes British ambassadors to Czechoslovakia, which divided into the Czech Republic and Slovakia in 1993.

Heads of Mission

Ambassadors to Czechoslovakia

Ambassadors to the Czech Republic

See also
Czech Republic–United Kingdom relations

Notes

a.  David Brighty continued as both ambassador to the Czech Republic, and as non-resident ambassador to Slovakia after the 1993 Dissolution of Czechoslovakia, until 1994, when he left the post and was replaced by Sir Michael Burton as ambassador to the Czech Republic and by Michael Bates as ambassador to Slovakia.

Citations

External links
British Embassy Prague

Czech Republic
United Kingdom
Ambassador